Judith Stein may refer to:
Judith E. Stein (born 1943), American art historian, curator, and artist
Judith Stein (historian) (1940–2017), professor of history